Brasserie de Luxembourg is the second largest brewery in Luxembourg, based in Diekirch. They also export to Belgium.
They brew beer under the brand name Diekirch and Mousel.

The Brasserie de Luxembourg was born in 2000 from the fusion of two breweries: The Brasserie Diekirch, founded in 1871, and the Brasserie Mousel founded in 1825.

History

2000 : Fusion of Diekirch and Mousel and takeover by Anheuser-Busch InBev

Economy

Beers
The following brands are sold under the Diekirch name: Diekirch and Mousel

See also
 Beer in Luxembourg

References

External links
 Official website

Breweries in Luxembourg
Food and drink companies established in 1871
1871 establishments in Europe